Fernando Néstor Ochoaizpur Iturain (born 18 March 1971 in Buenos Aires) is a Bolivian retired footballer, who played as a defender during his career. He is currently the manager of Andorran club Sant Julià.

Club career
Born in Argentina, Ochoaizpur played in several countries: Argentina, Bolivia, Peru, Mexico, and Ecuador.

International career
He was a regular choice for the Bolivia national football team from 1996 to 1999 and represented his country in 8 FIFA World Cup qualification matches.

References

External links

Mediotiempo

1971 births
Living people
People from Junín, Buenos Aires
Sportspeople from Buenos Aires Province
Argentine emigrants to Bolivia
Naturalized citizens of Bolivia
Association football defenders
Argentine footballers
Bolivian footballers
Bolivia international footballers
1999 Copa América players
Estudiantes de La Plata footballers
Club San José players
Oriente Petrolero players
Club Bolívar players
Club Universitario de Deportes footballers
San Luis F.C. players
Club Universidad Nacional footballers
Delfín S.C. footballers
C.D. Técnico Universitario footballers
San Martín de San Juan footballers
Club Atlético Sarmiento footballers
Bolivian expatriate footballers
Expatriate footballers in Peru
Expatriate footballers in Mexico
Expatriate footballers in Ecuador
Liga MX players
Bolivian expatriate football managers
Expatriate football managers in Andorra
Bolivian expatriate sportspeople in Andorra
Bolivian expatriate sportspeople in Mexico
Bolivian expatriate sportspeople in Ecuador
Bolivian expatriate sportspeople in Peru
Club Deportivo Guabirá managers
Club Real Potosí managers